Alien Pizza Planet is a restaurant located in Tomorrowland at Disneyland in Anaheim, California in the United States. The Atomic Age-style restaurant opened as Redd Rockett's Pizza Port on May 22, 1998, the same day as Astro Orbitor, Honey, I Shrunk the Audience, and Rocket Rods, replacing the Mission to Mars attraction. Redd Rockett's closed and re-opened as Alien Pizza Planet on April 13, 2018, during Pixar Fest. 

It is known for its Chicken Fusilli. It is across from the Starcade, and directly underneath Space Mountain. During Pixar Fest, it was updated to be Alien's Pizza Planet. That version however is still there today.

The restaurant uses counter service and features an Italian cuisine. The counter service is divided into three parts, mainly the Pizza Station which serves pizza, the Pasta Station which serves pasta, and the Salad Station which serves salad. Guests also have a choice to sit outdoors in front of the restaurant, indoor seating in front of the counters, outdoor seating located outside the back door of the restaurant, or even underneath the queue line of Space Mountain.

Gallery

References

External links
 

Tomorrowland
Restaurants in California
1998 establishments in California
Restaurants at Disneyland
Restaurants established in 1998